Swings and Roundabouts is the debut album by the British dance duo Shanks & Bigfoot. The album was released on 31 July 2000 but failed to break the UK top 75 despite the success of its two singles. It is best known for the 1999 hit single "Sweet Like Chocolate", which reached No. 1 in the UK as well as being a top 10 hit in Australia and New Zealand.

Released a year after the runaway success of "Sweet Like Chocolate", the follow-up single "Sing-A-Long" failed to meet popular expectation, reaching No. 12 on the UK Singles Chart. The majority of the female vocals for the album were provided by Terri Walker.

Critical reception
The Guardian called the album "surprisingly palatable", writing that the duo "offer amiable kid's-party fare, now and then sneaking out a great pop song such as 'Like You'." The Scotsman wrote that "Walker's vocals are clear, vivid pop treats, but the album as a whole is so obviously directed at the commercial rewards of a string of top-ten hits that it loses all credibility."

Track listing
All songs written by Steven Meade and Danny Langsman.

"Sing-A-Long" – 3:31
"Spinning Wheel" – 3:24
"Five Miles Wide" – 3:22
"Sweet Like Chocolate" – 3:37
"King of Winter" – 3:32
"Like You" – 4:02
"Flower Without You" – 3:23
"Our Way" – 3:43
"Step to My Beat" – 4:56
"Trust in Me" – 4:04

Bonus tracks
"Sing-A-Long" (Wideboys Vocal Remix) – 4:45
"Sweet Like Chocolate" (Metro 7" Mix) – 3:14

References

2000 debut albums
Jive Records albums
UK garage albums